Carelia may refer to: 
Carelia (gastropod), a genus of snails
Karelia, name of a region in Finland and Russia
Karelia (cigarettes), Greek brand of cigarettes.

See also
Karelia (disambiguation)